Paul Yaw Addo (born 14 June 1990) is a Ghanaian footballer who most recently played as a defender for Norwegian side Bryne.

Career
Addo was born in Accra and began his career with Fair Point and signed on 11 June 2008 for Bechem Chelsea. He joined in February 2009 for a trial to the Norwegian club Løv-Ham and signed a contract.

Addo played his debut for Løv-Ham on 5 April 2009 against Moss. He trained with Brann and played a testimonial match for the club on 21 November 2009.

Addo joined Odd Grenland on loan in 2011, before he joined the club on a permanent contract the next year. Addo was a regular in Odd's defence until Emil Jonassen became the preferred left back. In the 2013 season he joined Strømmen on loan. After the season, he transferred to Bryne. He left Bryne again at the end of the 2018 season.

International career 
He represented the Ghana U-17 in 2007 FIFA U-17 World Cup in Korea Republic as captain.

Career statistics

References

1990 births
Living people
Footballers from Accra
Ghanaian footballers
Berekum Chelsea F.C. players
Løv-Ham Fotball players
Odds BK players
Strømmen IF players
Bryne FK players
Eliteserien players
Norwegian First Division players
Norwegian Second Division players
Expatriate footballers in Norway
Ghanaian expatriate footballers
Ghanaian expatriate sportspeople in Norway
Association football fullbacks